A Limerick City and County Council election was held in County Limerick and Limerick City in Ireland on 24 May 2019 as part of that year's local elections. All 40 councillors were elected for a five-year term of office from 6 local electoral areas (LEAs) by single transferable vote.

The 2018 boundary review committee recommended significant changes to the LEAs in the 2014 elections due to terms of references requiring a maximum of seven councillors in each LEA and changes in population revealed in the 2016 census. These changes were adopted by statutory instrument No. 624/2018.

The election was held alongside a plebiscite on whether or not Limerick City and County would establish the position of a directly elected mayor for the council under the Local Government Act 2019. The plebiscite narrowly approved the proposition, by 52.4% to 47.6
%. It was one of three areas to hold such a plebiscite, and the only one where the proposition passed.

The new council's 40 members included 16 new councillors, and one returning member who been defeated in 2014. 23 of the outgoing 33 councillors who stood for re-election were returned. The total of 8 women was unchanged from 2014, but 6 of those women were first-time councilors.

Results by party

Results by local electoral area

Adare–Rathkeale

Cappamore–Kilmallock

Limerick City East

Limerick City North

Limerick City West

Newcastle West

Results by gender

Plebiscite

Changes since 2019 local elections
†Adare-Rathkeale Independent Cllr Richard O'Donoghue was elected as a Teachta Dála (TD) for Limerick County at the 2020 general election. His brother John O'Donoghue was co-opted to fill the vacancy on 25 February 2020.
††Cappamore–Kilmallock Fianna Fáil Cllr Eddie Ryan resigned from the party and became an Independent on 23 June 2020
†††Limerick City North Green Party Cllr Brian Leddin was elected as a TD for Limerick City at the 2020 general election. Sasa Novak Ui Conchuir was co-opted to fill the vacancy on 25 February 2020.
††††Limerick City West Social Democrat Cllr Elisa O'Donovan resigned from the party and became an Independent on 24 June 2020 saying she "felt it would be better to serve her constituents as an Independent Councillor."

Footnotes

Sources

References

2019 Irish local elections
2019